The MIT Department of Biology ("Course VII") is a center for research and teaching in the life sciences.  Many members of the faculty hold joint appointments with other departments at MIT and with outside institutions.

Faculty members
 faculty members include:

Full Professors
 Angelika Amon
 Tania A. Baker
 David Bartel
 Stephen P. Bell
 Christopher Burge
 Iain Cheeseman
Jianzhu Chen
 Cathy Drennan
 Gerald Fink
 Frank Gertler
Alan Grossman
 Leonard P. Guarente
 H. Robert Horvitz, S.B. 1968
David Housman
Richard Hynes
Barbara Imperiali
 Tyler Jacks
 Rudolf Jaenisch
Chris Kaiser
Amy Keating
Monty Krieger
 Eric S. Lander
Michael T. Laub
Jacqueline Lees
J. Troy Littleton
 Harvey F. Lodish
 David C. Page
Uttam RajBhandary
Peter Reddien
 Aviv Regev
 David M. Sabatini
 Robert T. Sauer
Thomas Schwartz
 Phillip A. Sharp
Anthony Sinskey
 Hazel Sive
Frank Solomon
 Lisa Steiner
 Susumu Tonegawa
 Matthew Vander Heiden
Graham Walker
 Robert A. Weinberg, Ph.D. 1969
 Michael B. Yaffe
 Richard A. Young

Associate professors
Laurie Boyer
Mary Gehring
Michael Hemann
Adam C. Martin

Assistant professors
Eliezer Calo
Joseph H. Davis
Ankur Jain
Rebecca Lamason
Gene-Wei Li
Pulin Li
Sebastian Lourido
Stefani Spranger
Jing-Ke Weng
Seychelle Vos
Omer Yilmaz

Professors with primary appointments in other departments
 Sallie (Penny) Chisholm
Douglas Lauffenburger
 Elly Nedivi
Matthew Wilson

Professors emeriti
 Martha Constantine-Paton
 Malcolm Gefter
 Nancy Hopkins
Jonathan King
 Terry Orr-Weaver
 Mary-Lou Pardue
 Sheldon Penman
 Phillips Robbins
 Robert Rosenberg
 Leona D. Samson
 Paul Schimmel
 Edward Scolnick
 Ethan Signer
 JoAnne Stubbe
William (Chip) Quinn

Department Heads
 1889-1921 William T. Sedgwick	
 1921-1942 Samuel C. Prescott	
 1942-1955 Francis O. Schmitt	
 1957-1966 Irwin W. Sizer	
 1966-1977 Boris Magasanik	
 1977-1985 Gene M. Brown	       
 1985-1989 Maurice Fox	        
 1989-1991 Richard O. Hynes	
 1991-1999 Phillip Sharp	
 1999-2004 Robert T. Sauer	
 2004-2012 Chris Kaiser	
 2012-2014 Tania Baker	
 2014-     Alan Grossman

Alumni
Alumni of the department include:

Nobel laureates
The department can claim several winners of the Nobel Prize for Physiology or Medicine among its faculty and alumni.  They are:
 Michael Rosbash, 2017
 Andrew Fire, 2006
 H. Robert Horvitz, 2002
 Leland H. Hartwell, 2001
 Phillip A. Sharp, 1993
 E. Donnall Thomas, 1990
 Susumu Tonegawa, 1987
 David Baltimore, 1975
 Salvador Luria, 1969
 Har Gobind Khorana, 1968

Former faculty
Former faculty include:
 Gene Brown
 Arnold Demain
 Herman Eisen
 Vernon Ingram
 Susan Lindquist
 Maurice Fox
 Har Gobind Khorana
 Irving London
 Salvador Luria
 Alexander Rich

Other notable alumni
Other notable alumni include
 Victor Ambros, Ph.D., 1979
 Cornelia Bargmann, Ph.D., 1987
 Kevin Eggan, Ph.D., 2002
 Stephen J. Elledge, Ph.D., 1983
 Andrew Fire, Ph.D., 1983
 Leland H. Hartwell, Ph.D., 1964
 Richard O. Hynes, Ph.D., 1971
 Cynthia Kenyon, Ph.D., 1979
 Michael Rosbash, Ph.D., 1970
 Allan C. Spradling, Ph.D., 1975

References

Biology Department